Season of Love is a 2013 Hong Kong TVB romance drama that explores the complexity of human love. The drama is a collection of love stories made up of four different segments, with each segment representing one of the four season of the year. Him Law and Toby Leung were featured in the Spring segment. The Summer segment featured Kate Tsui and Ron Ng. The Autumn segment featured a complex love triangle portrayed by Nancy Wu, Vincent Wong and Oscar Leung while the Winter segment featured Kenneth Ma and Myolie Wu.

Cast

Spring
Him Law as Season See San, a famous celebrity. 
Toby Leung as Lam Chun Fun, a cargo worker who admires Season.

Summer
Kate Tsui as Summer Ha Chi Yan, an aggressive television producer.
Ron Ng as CK Ng Chun Kai, a photographer.

Autumn / Fall 
Nancy Wu as Kim Ho Chau Sang, a hairdresser.
Vincent Wong as Simon Fung Sau Man, a lawyer.
Oscar Leung as Ray Fong Ka Wai, a hairdresser and Kim's colleague. Also Kim's former husband.

Winter
Kenneth Ma as Joe Chu Cho On, a private eye and the only one to appear in all four segments.
Myolie Wu as Toni Yiu Tong Nei, a historical and cultural docent.

Joe

Viewership ratings

TVB dramas
2013 Hong Kong television series debuts
2013 Hong Kong television series endings